Miye ou Miye is a village in southern Lebanon located 5 km (3.2 mi) East of Sidon and 45 km (28 mi) south of the capital Beirut and it overlooks the Mediterranean Sea. The village lies at an average altitude of 156 m (512 ft) above sea level.  Miye ou Miyes' surface (with houses built on it) stretches for 230 hectares (2.3 km² - 0.8878 mi²).  The village is bordered with a number of villages/towns: East: Qraiyeh, Ain El Delb; West: Sidon; North: Haret Saida; and South: Darb es Sim, Zaghdraiya.

Etymology
Legend has it there are three possible root words for the name of the town Miye ou Miye:
 It stems from the Phoenician language “Mio Mia”, which means a place where there is mummification water; In fact, there are many Phoenician tombs located at Beirut National Museum that were found by the Missionary Dr. George Ford while building Gerard Institute for the boys (1881) and other facilities and halls on Miye ou Miye land.  This is the most likely explanation for the name of the town.
 It also comes from the Arabic language meaning “mieyya ”, which means one hundred.  During a census of the number of villages that the Druze won in war during the 1800s in the Iqlim al-Tuffah;  Miye ou Miye the village, was number 200 on the roster. They presented their winnings in a batch format of 100.  We won "mieyya" and this is the second "mieyya".  So, it was named Miye ou Miye.
 Due to abundance of water in the area, the village was named Mayya w Mayya, meaning water and water in Assyrian.

Demographics
Miye ou Miye’s population prior to 1985, which is when the town was attacked during the civil war, was around 5000+ inhabitants. Due to the displacement by the civil war; about half the population migrated to Western countries, about a quarter moved to the capital, Beirut, and the rest returned and settled in Miye ou Miye. Miye ou Miye is a Christian village. The people of Miye ou Miye are mostly members of the Melkite Greek Catholic Church (85%), with a few Maronites (7%), Protestants (6%), and Baptists (2%). The population of the town doubles when the immigrants / expatriates return to spend their summer vacations in their ancestral home. Arabic is the official language; English and French are also spoken.

Neighborhoods

History

In the 17th century, Miye ou Miye was mostly farmland owned by a number of wealthy families. The families of "Abu Nakad" and "Faddoul" owned half of the land and the state owned the rest.  In the 18th century, Christians started to move to the village, and the state encouraged the farmers by giving them land to farm.  The farmers in return had to pay back 10% of the crops. In 1875 Victor Guérin found the village to have 400 inhabitants,  some Maronites and some Greek Orthodox.

In the 19th century, American missionaries came to the village for missionary work. In 1985, the Lebanese Civil War spread to South Lebanon, and the villagers fled for their safety farther south and others went to the capital.  From there they started their journey abroad to over 26 countries.  The majority went to the United States of America, Canada, and Australia. In August 1991, the Miye ou Miye refugees returned and started rebuilding the village that was destroyed completely.  Today, Miye ou Miye is full of life and it became better than it was before the war.  Immigrants, who are living away from their hometown, carried their little town in their hearts along with deep pride of their heritage.  This deep love and passion guided them in their daily lives and provided a moral compass.
The Miye ou Miye population includes the following families:

Culture and Art
 Every year in the middle of July, Arine Sports Club and Miye ou Miye municipality hold a two-week athletic festival that includes games, tournaments, and other live events called "Karmes" or Carnaval.  The games are played at Nasri Wakim arena, located in the middle of town in Beaula neighborhood.  In addition, the World Vision International sponsored a library in town, which has enhanced the capabilities of, and resources for students; the youth, as well as adults. Also, an infirmary or a clinic is located in town to provide medical care mainly to the elderly.  This invaluable service provided easy, walking distance access for the town's elderly.
 It is worth mentioning that Miye ou Miye had a renowned artist, who was a painter and a sculpture.  Mr. Rashid Gerges Semaan, studied art in the most prestigious art institutes in Italy, graduated with high honors and returned to his native hometown to serve his community and his country.  He sculpted several famous statues, most notably was the statue of the late Egyptian President Gamal Abdel Nasser, Maarouf Saad, and Motherhood.  Mr. Semaan was known as a passionate artist and poet who transformed a dull concept into a charming, beautiful, and seductive form of artistic beauty. Currently, the town boasts two professional individuals who are trailing blazers in the beauty of art and literature: Dr. Mounif Moussa and Hannah Shakeeb Bousaba.

Economy

Miye ou Miye's main industry is agriculture.  The town produces olive oil, edible olives, figs, and loquat (acadinia, pi-pa, mespila).  Some olive trees date back to the Ottoman Empire days, while others date back to the era of Prince Fakhr-al-Din II Al-maani Al Kabiir.  Livelihood from agricultural and farming products dwindled with time.  The younger generation focused their energy on higher education where a new crop of professionals has emerged such as: doctors, business owners, dentists, lawyers, engineers, etc.

Over the years, Miye ou Miye has provided its fair share of soldiers and officers to the country they all love and adore.  They wore the uniform with pride and some made the ultimate sacrifice for their country.

Panoramic View

Education
National Evangelical School for Girls and Boys
Miye ou Miye High School

Health
Miye ou Miye Clinic
Hariri Clinic
Sidon Governmental Hospital
El Hamshary Hospital

Institutions
Arine Sports Club
Miye ou Miye Senior's Club
Officer's Military Club & Compound

Landscape
Landscape in Miye ou Miye Matthews Vegetation Zone: evergreen broadleaved shrub land/thicket and evergreen dwarf shrub land.  The soil type: luvisols, cambisols (LV), soil with clay-enriched lower horizon, high CEC, and high saturation bases.  There is no malaria occurrence.  Miye ou Miye is in a very strong (vii) earthquake zone on average one every 50 years, with occurrences of earthquakes at 6-7 Richter scale.  There is a medium to high occurrence of flooding with a risk factor of 7 out of 10.  Also, drought is an issue in the town with a risk factor of 9 out of 10.

Weather
Miye ou Miye experiences temperate climatic conditions with clearly defined seasons. Summers are hot and dry, while winters are cold and wet. The temperatures in Miye ou Miye are considered mild and humid climate.
Summer spans the months of June to September and is the most popular time to visit, with temperatures peaking in July and August. At their hottest, summer days reach about 31 °C ( 88 °F) and occasional heat weave conditions. 
Winter takes charge from December to March and during this time, Miye ou Miye sees a great deal of rain.  Winter conditions are much milder with the mercury rarely dropping below 11 °C  (52 °F). Spring and fall are pleasant as the weather is warm but not unbearable.

Miye ou Miye, experiences شلوق shlūq winds (also known as Sirocco in Europe and Khamaseen in Northern Africa).  These winds are most common during autumn and spring seasons.  Shlūq winds are red Sahara dust and is associated with storms and heavy rain, the wind being very strong, the duration may be as short as half a day or may last several days (usually four days).

Parks and recreation
Miye ou Miye Park was created in 2001.

Byader Park is used for religious activities and athletic events.  This land used to be owned by several farmers’ families.  At this location the farmers used to beat the head of the wheat stalk with a club like tool to loosen the grain, then throw it into the air. The lighter chaff material blew away further on the ground than the grain which was heavier. The grain was then collected and sold at the local mill.  Over the years, they donated their ownership in this land to the interest of the town.

Religious & historical Sites
Saint Georges Spring (Nabaat Mar Giryos)

A shepherd from the village had several different dreams during a period of time.  Always in these dreams, a knight (ref: rider, Saint George) was riding a white horse, while the shepherd was herding his sheep.  In each dream, the knight told the shepherd to tell the mayor and the priest of the village to dig in this particular spot and your town will have a natural water spring.  And the rider added, in case the people in town did not believe you; take this olive branch with fruits on it as a proof.  When this event occurred, the harvest of the olive fruit was long gone.  The people of the village did not believe the shepherd at first, until he showed them the olive branch with the fruits on it.  They dug where Saint Georges pointed, and water came out.  St. Georges Natural Spring became a holy place and is called in Arabic “Nabaat Mar Giryos".  The natural spring became the destination for many people, mainly for praying and healing.  The elderly in the village are still telling this story from generation to generation.  Unfortunately, after the civil war in 1985 in Miye ou Miye and the displacement of the town's people, the St. George's natural spring was bulldozed and covered with dirt and debris.

Ramapo Hall

National Evangelical Institute for Girls and Boys is one of the National Evangelical Synod Schools in Lebanon. It is a private school and the union of two old and historical famous institutions: Sidon Evangelical School for Girls (SESG) that was first founded in 1862 and Gerard Institute for the boys that was first founded in 1881 by the missionaries Rev. William King Eddy and Dr. George Ford. Dr. Ford had a grander vision of building an orphanage and other facilities in Miye ou Miye hilltop overlooking the ancient city of Sidon.  But since he was in need of funds to build it, he traveled to Ramapo, New York, and secured donations from the local Christian community.  The word Ramapo (Ramapough), is from Native American origin, meaning either "sweet water" or "sloping/slanting rocks".  In 1881, with the donation money secured, he built Ramapo Hall, Peace Hall, among other buildings in Miye ou Miye.  During World War II, the Australian 7th Division, with British and Free French, supported by the Royal Australian Air Force, Royal Australian Navy, Royal Navy and Royal Air Force, fought for Miye ou Miye against Vichy French forces in 1941.  The Free France Forces turned the orphanage into a prison when they defeated the Vichy French.  In 1942-43, the Lebanese people strived for independence from the French control. The French authorities responded by arresting and imprisoning key Lebanese leaders at Ramapo hall.  Lebanese Christian and Muslim leaders united their forces, supported by the international community and regional powers, to pressure the French government which resulted in releasing the prisoners on November 22, 1943 and recognizing Lebanon's full and complete independence.  In 1948, Palestinian refugees were driven from their homeland during the Israeli-Palestinian conflict and some of them settled at the outskirts of Miye ou Miye, occupying the land and the Palace(Ramapo Hall).  Since then, the West of Miye ou Miye village became known as Mieh Mieh refugee camp.  Also, below the hill of Miye ou Miye refugee camp another camp was created at that time and became known as Ain al-Hilweh Palestinian refugee camp.

References

Bibliography

External links
 
Miyeh ou Miyeh,  Localiban

Populated places in Sidon District
Melkite Christian communities in Lebanon